Davida Wills Hurwin is an American writer who is best known for her books A Time for Dancing and The Farther You Run.

A Time For Dancing received the ALA's best books award, South Carolina Award. The Farther You Run was a NY Best books for Teens. Freaks and Revelations was a 2011 Stonewall Honor Book. Hurwin is also an educator, teaching Theater at Crossroads School for Arts and Sciences in Los Angeles, California.

Works 
 A Time for Dancing (1997, Penguin Group). This was adapted by into the screenplay for the movie released in Italy as Dancing, and released in the US on Showtime as A Time for Dancing (2000).
 The Farther You Run (2003 for hardcover, 2005 for paperback, Penguin Group)
 Circle the Soul Softly (2006, HarperCollins).
 Freaks and Revelations (2009)

References

Living people
Year of birth missing (living people)
American women writers
21st-century American women